The following television stations broadcast on digital channel 35 in Mexico:

 XEDK-TDT in Guadalajara, Jalisco
 XEJ-TDT in Ciudad Juárez, Chihuahua
 XELN-TDT in Torreón, Coahuila de Zaragoza
 XHAG-TDT in Aguascalientes, Aguascalientes
 XHATO-TDT in Guanajuato, Guanajuato
 XHATV-TDT in Santiago Tuxtla, Veracruz
 XHBK-TDT in Ciudad Obregón, Sonora 
 XHBVT-TDT in San Buenaventura, Chihuahua
 XHCPCS-TDT in Cabo San Lucas, Baja California Sur
 XHCTNL-TDT in Nuevo Laredo, Tamaulipas
 XHDLG-TDT in Dolores Hidalgo, Guanajuato
 XHDO-TDT in Culiacán, Sinaloa 
 XHDZ-TDT in Comitán de Domínguez, Chiapas
 XHGAC-TDT in Acámbaro, Guanajuato
 XHGHU-TDT in Huanímaro, Guanajuato
 XHGJR-TDT in Santa Cruz de Juventino Rosas, Guanajuato
 XHGMV-TDT in Santiago Maravatio, Guanajuato
 XHGN-TDT in Ciudad del Carmen, Campeche 
 XHHCG-TDT in Chilpancingo, Guerrero
 XHIH-TDT in Tehuantepec, Oaxaca 
 XHLUC-TDT in Jocotitlan, México 
 XHMEN-TDT in Mérida, Yucatán 
 XHMNU-TDT in Monterrey, Nuevo León
 XHMOT-TDT in Monclova, Coahuila
 XHPVE-TDT in Puerto Vallarta, Jalisco
 XHRSO-TDT in Rosario, Sonora 
 XHSLS-TDT in San Luis Potosí, San Luis Potosí
 XHSPROA-TDT in Oaxaca, Oaxaca 
 XHSPRTA-TDT in Tampico, Tamaulipas 
 XHSPRXA-TDT in Xalapa, Veracruz
 XHSVT-TDT in Caborca, Sonora 
 XHSYO-TDT in Soyopa, Sonora 
 XHUJAT-TDT in Villahermosa, Tabasco
 XHWDT-TDT in Ciudad Allende, Coahuila

35